Nkqubela Chest Hospital is a specialised TB hospital situated in Mdantsane near East London, Eastern Cape in South Africa. It was established in 1965 and used to be operated by Lifecare as a TB hospital.

The hospital departments include Medical Services, Paediatrics, Out Patients Department, Pharmacy, TB Services, PMTC & VCT, Anti-Retroviral (ARV) treatment for HIV/AIDS, X-ray Services, Occupational Services, Laundry Services and Kitchen Services.

References
Nkqubela TB Hospital

Hospital buildings completed in 1965
Hospitals in the Eastern Cape
Buffalo City Metropolitan Municipality
20th-century architecture in South Africa